Khamoshi (Hindi: ख़ामोशी, translation: Silence) is a 1969 black-and-white Hindi drama film directed by Asit Sen, starring Waheeda Rehman and Rajesh Khanna. It is especially remembered for its memorable music by Hemant Kumar and lyrics by Gulzar in songs such as "Tum Pukaar Lo... Tumhara Intezaar Hai" sung by Hemant Kumar, "Woh Shaam Kuch Ajeeb Thi" by Kishore Kumar and "Humne Dekhi Hai In Aankhon Ki Mehekti Khushboo" sung by Lata Mangeshkar. Though what really made this film stand out was the B&W cinematography by Kamal Bose, who won Best Cinematographer at the 18th Filmfare Awards for his work in the film and received high critical acclaim for Rehman and Khanna's performances. Rehman's performance earned her a Best Actress nomination at the same ceremony. The film was a moderate success at the box-office.

Khamoshi was shot in Calcutta and was based on the Bengali short story titled Nurse Mitra by noted Bengali writer, Ashutosh Mukherjee and is a remake of director Asit Sen's own Bengali film, Deep Jwele Jaai (1959), starring Suchitra Sen. The Bengali original proved to be a hit at the box office, especially at the urban centres. Impressed by the story line, producer Vuppunuthula Purushotham Reddy and director G. Ramineedu remade the Bengali film into Chivaraku Migiledi (1960), which was a blockbuster.

Background
Director Asit Sen (not to be confused with the actor-comedian Asit Sen) acted in the original Bengali film Deep Jwele Jaai (1959) in a role which was essayed by Dharmendra in Khamoshi, where the movie-goers could not recognise Asit Sen, because it was a dark scene marked with the baritone voice of Hemant Kumar. Later, he revealed himself in an interview in the 1990s. After his success in the off-beat films Mamta (1966) and Anokhi Raat (1968), Sen, wanting to make it big in Bombay as well, decided to remake his Bengali hit.

The lead actress of the film, Waheeda Rehman suggested the name of actor Rajesh Khanna to Sen, having been impressed by his work in Aakhri Khat (1966). She said that her own performance came "nowhere near that of Suchitra Sen in the original." She credited the director for helping her a lot during difficult scenes. Rehman said in an interview that she could not meet the standards set by Savitri in Chivaraku Migiledi (1960) for the character.

Plot
Colonel Sahab (Nazir Hussain), a world war II veteran doctor, is head of psychiatry ward. Nurse Radha (Waheeda Rehman) in the same ward is heart-broken after a civilian patient, Dev Kumar (Dharmendra), whom she cured by pouring out her love and affection, left the hospital. She had been unable to keep her heart separate from her professional work and had fallen in love with that patient. Now Arun Choudhary (Rajesh Khanna), a writer and poet enters as a patient, suffering from acute mania after being rejected by his lover, Sulekha, a singer. After refusing to take care of him initially, Radha later relents. While caring for Arun, she reminisces about her past and tells a story of how she took care of injured brave army soldiers when she was posted in Ladakh during the Sino-Indian war of 1962.

Gradually, Arun is cured but Nurse Radha, yet again is emotionally involved with her patient. Unable to deal with her complex feelings, Radha becomes emotionally deranged. Ironically she is admitted to the same room of the ward. Colonel Sahab regrets that while he always saw a devoted nurse in her and omitted to see the woman inside her. Arun promises to wait for her recovery.

Cast
 Waheeda Rehman as Nurse Radha
 Rajesh Khanna as Arun Choudhary (Patient #24)
 Dharmendra as Dev Kumar (Patient #24) (Guest Appearance)
 Nazir Hussain as Dr. Colonel Saab
 Iftekhar as Doctor
 Lalita Pawar as Matron
 Deven Verma as Patient #22
 Anwar Hussain as Biharilal Gupta
 Snehalata as Sulekha, Arun's girlfriend

Music
The music was composed by Hemant Kumar and lyrics were written by Gulzar.

Tracklist -

01. "Tum Pukaar Lo.. Tumhara Intezaar Hai": Hemant Kumar
02. "Woh Shaam Kuch Ajeeb Thi.. Yeh Shaam Bhi Ajeeb Hai" : Kishore Kumar
03. "Humne Dekhi Hai Un Aankhon Ki Mehekti Khushboo": Lata Mangeshkar
04. "Aaj Ki Raat Chiraagon": Aarti Mukherjee
05. "Dost Kahaan Koi Tumsa": Manna Dey

Awards & Nominations
18th Filmfare Awards

Won

 Best Cinematographer (B&W) – Kamal Bose

Nominated
Best Actress – Waheeda Rehman

References

External links
 

1969 films
1960s Hindi-language films
Indian black-and-white films
Films set in psychiatric hospitals
Films based on short fiction
Films set in Kolkata
Hindi remakes of Bengali films
Indian drama films
Indian psychological drama films
Films scored by Hemant Kumar
Films based on works by Ashutosh Mukhopadhyay